Volkhovskaya is a rural locality (a village) in Noginskoye Rural Settlement, Syamzhensky District, Vologda Oblast, Russia. The population was 25 as of 2002.

Geography 
Volkhovskaya is located 5 km southwest of Syamzha (the district's administrative centre) by road. Noginskaya is the nearest rural locality.

References 

Rural localities in Syamzhensky District